K'ara K'ara (Aymara for crest, Hispanicized spelling Caracara) is a mountain in the Andes of southern Peru, about  high . It is located in the Tacna Region, Candarave Province, Candarave District. K'ara K'ara lies southwest of K'ank'awi.

K'ara K'ara is also the name of an intermittent stream which originates west of the mountain. It flows to the west.

References

Mountains of Peru
Mountains of Tacna Region